Jeotgalibaca arthritidis is a Gram-positive bacterium from the genus Jeotgalibaca which has been isolated from the liquid of a joint from pigs.

References

Lactobacillales
Bacteria described in 2017